Nationality words link to articles with information on the nation's poetry or literature (for instance, Irish or France).

Events
 February 1 – King James I of England grants Ben Jonson an annual pension of 100 marks, making him de facto poet laureate.

Works published

Great Britain
 William Browne, Britannia's Pastorals. The Second Booke (see also Book 1, 1613; both books published together 1625)
 George Chapman, translator:
 The Divine Poem of Musaeus. First of all Books, translated from Musaeus', De Herone et Leandro (Hero and Leander)
 The Whole Works of Homer, publication year uncertain (see also Seaven Bookes of the Iliades of Homer 1598, Homer Prince of Poets 1609, The Iliads of Homer 1611, Homers Odysses 1614, Twenty-four Bookes of Homers Odisses 1615)
 Ben Jonson:
 To Celia
 On my first Sonne
 The Workes of Beniamin Ionson (the first folio collection, including Epigrams and The Forest)
 Robert Southwell, S.J., S. Peters Complaint. And Saint Mary Magdalens Funerall Teares, "By R.S. of the Society of Jesus" (see also Marie Magdalens Funeral Teares 1591 and Saint Peters Complaint 1595)

Other
Agrippa d'Aubigné, Les Tragiques, France
 Georg Rudolf Weckherlin, Odes and Songs, Germany

Births
Death years link to the corresponding "[year] in poetry" article:
 March 13 – Joseph Beaumont (died 1699), English clergyman, academic and poet
 July 10 – Antonio del Castillo y Saavedra (died 1668), Spanish Baroque painter, sculptor and poet
 October 11 – Andreas Gryphius (died 1664), German poet and dramatist
Also:
 Christen Aagaard (died 1664), Danish poet and professor
 Johann Klaj (died 1656), German poet
 Sokuhi Nyoitsu (died 1671), Chinese Buddhist monk, poet and calligrapher
 Ye Xiaoluan, Chinese poet and daughter of poet Shen Yixiu; her sisters, Ye Wanwan and Ye Xiaowan were also poets

Deaths

Birth years link to the corresponding "[year] in poetry" article:
 March 6 – Francis Beaumont (born 1584), English playwright and poet
 March 18 – Cornelis Ketel (born 1548), Dutch Mannerist painter, poet and orator
 April 22 (Gregorian calendar) – Miguel de Cervantes (born 1547), Spanish novelist, poet and playwright
 April 23 (Julian calendar) – William Shakespeare (born 1564), English playwright and poet, widely regarded as the greatest writer in the English language

See also
 Poetry

 16th century in poetry
 16th century in literature

Notes

17th-century poetry
Poetry